The reckoning board, also called a memory board or hole board, could be used on its own as a basic counting device or used with an abacus for engineering.

There were two types of reckoning board. The older type was a simple 10 × 10 grid of holes. A peg would be inserted into a hole and moved along, starting from the top and working downwards. It was used as a memory aid when counting certain units. For every sack of grain or bar of steel, the peg would be moved forward and after a day or a week, the total number counted could be seen.

The more advanced type had columns of holes, with the columns indicating place value.

See also
Cribbage board
Sand table

References 

 Alex Grandell, "The Accounting Historians Journal" Spring 1977.
 

Mechanical calculators